Lavi may refer to the following notable people:

Given name
Lavi Hrib (born 1973), Romanian football defender

Surname
Amir Lavi (born 1988), Israeli football player
Amos Lavi (1953–2010), Israeli stage and film actor
 Daliah Lavi (1942–2017), Israeli actress and singer
David Lavi (born 1956), Israeli football player
 Inbar Lavi (born 1986), Israeli-American actress
Moran Lavi (born 1983), Israeli football player
Mordechai Lavi (born 1978), Israeli radio broadcaster
Neta Lavi (born 1996), Israeli football player
Shimon Lavi (1486–1585), Sephardi kabbalist, physician, astronomer and poet
Shlomo Lavi (1882–1963), Zionist activist and politician
Veikko Lavi (1912–1996), Finnish singer, songwriter and author.
Yaniv Lavi (born 1988), Israeli football player and manager
 Yoel Lavi (born 1950), Israeli politician